is a Japanese manga artist from Tosa, Kōchi. He is most known for the street racing series Wangan Midnight serialized in Kodansha's weekly Young Magazine and which has been adapted into a 26 episode anime series, a series of video games, and a movie.

Other manga series created by Michiharu Kusunoki include J Monogatari and Shakotan Boogie also published by Kodansha.

Works
Aitsu to Lullaby (1981–1989, serialized in Weekly Shōnen Magazine, Kodansha)
Shakotan Boogie (1986–1996, serialized in Young Magazine, Kodansha)
Sayonara December (1987, Kodansha)
Wangan Midnight (1993–2008, serialized in Young Magazine, Kodansha)
J Monogatari (1998, Kodansha)
Tokyo Broker (2003, serialized in Morning, Kodansha)
Wangan Midnight C1 Runner (2009–2012, serialized in Young Magazine, Kodansha)
Eight (2012–2013, serialized in Young Magazine, Kodansha)
Ginkai no Speed Star (2014–2015, serialized in Big Comic Spirits, Shogakukan)
Kami-sama no Joker (as writer, with Mizu Sahara) (2015-2016, serialized in Evening, Kodansha)
Shutoko SPL -Silver Ash Speedster- (2016-ongoing, serialized in Monthly Young Magazine, Kodansha)

References

External links

1957 births
Living people
Manga artists from Kōchi Prefecture
People from Tosa, Kōchi